The Honda Pilot is a mid-size crossover SUV with three-row seating manufactured by Honda since 2002. Primarily aimed at the North American market, the Pilot is the largest SUV produced by Honda. Pilots are currently manufactured in Lincoln, Alabama, and the Pilot was produced in Alliston, Ontario until April 2007. The first generation Pilot was released in April 2002 as a 2003 model.

The Pilot shares its platform with the Acura MDX, as well as the North American market Odyssey minivan. The Pilot's unibody construction and independent suspension are designed to provide handling similar to that of a car, and it has integrated perimeter frame rails to permit towing and light off-road use.

Prior to the introduction of the Pilot, Honda marketed the compact crossover CR-V and the Honda Passport (a rebadged Isuzu Rodeo). The Honda Passport that was sold between 1993 and 2002 was a truck-based design. The Pilot is Honda's largest SUV, although the 2010 Crosstour surpassed the Pilot in length.

The Pilot is sold in North America and the Middle East, while the Honda MDX (first generation Acura MDX) was marketed in Japan and Australia for several years. The second-generation Pilot was also sold in Russia, Ukraine, South Korea, Latin America, and the Philippines.

First generation (YF1/2; 2002)

Specifications

All Pilots from 2003-2005 feature VTM-4, Honda's four-wheel drive system.

The Pilot received more updates starting with the 2006 model year, engines were either the J35Z1 (FWD) or the J35A9 (4WD). This was the first time 4WD was not standard on the Pilot.

The new FWD models featured Honda's Variable Cylinder Management (VCM) system, which can deactivate up to three cylinders under light load to increase fuel economy, to help control noise from the system Honda added Active Control Engine Mount System (ACM) and Active Noise Cancellation (ANC).  Further, this version of the J35 featured updated iVTEC and the automatic transmission a shorter 1st gear ratio.  With powertrain updates and the lack of VTM-4 the FWD version had improved fuel economy of 18-city/24-highway, an increase of +1/+2 mpg versus the 4WD.

All Pilots from this generation feature a 5-speed automatic transmission. The Pilot has front struts with a coil-spring, multilink rear suspension for a flat rear load floor. The front track is 66.3 in (1,684 mm) and 66.5 in (1,689 mm) at the rear. The Pilot has a 4,500 lb (2,041 kg) boat/3,500 lb (1,588 kg) trailer towing capability with the optional dealer-installed towing package.

Pilots with Honda's Variable Torque Management 4WD system (VTM-4) sent most power to the front wheels under normal driving conditions. Under acceleration or if wheel slippage is detected at the front wheels, up to 50% of power can be sent to the rear wheels. The system also features a VTM-4 lock button on the dashboard which locks the rear differential and sends 25% of the power to each rear wheel. However, the VTM-4 lock function only operates in first gear, second gear and reverse, and automatically disengages above , then re-engages when the speed drops below .

Design
Design of the Pilot was by Honda's Ricky Hsu through 1999, when styling was approved. The Pilot can accommodate eight passengers in three rows configured as stadium seating as a standard feature. The third row can seat three, but the limited legroom makes it suitable only for small children or adults on short trips. Similar to the Honda Odyssey, the rear seats can be folded into flat surfaces for larger cargo. Options include a DVD entertainment system or a navigation system for EX-L models, but both cannot be installed simultaneously on the same car.

Other features include ABS-equipped four-wheel disc brakes, rack-and-pinion steering, four-wheel independent suspension, and 282° of outward visibility.

2004 changes
For the 2004 model year, Honda increased adjustability on second-row seats and added heated front seats and side mirrors to EX-L models.

2005 changes
For the 2005 model year, Honda added tire pressure monitoring, electronic stability control, revised steering, and upgraded the airbags.

2006 facelift

Honda revised the Pilot for the 2006 model year in October 2005. Changes to the exterior included a new fascia with a different grille insert and halogen projector headlights, and tail lights with clear lenses. The EX trim level received redesigned wheels, and the original EX wheels were now found on the LX trim. For the first time, body colored door handles are introduced to the Pilot on the EX trim, and a powered moonroof is introduced to the Pilot on the EX-L trim. On the inside, side airbags were provided in the C pillar, the gauge cluster was updated and the center console featured chrome trim and redesigned storage compartments and cup holders. For the 2006 model year, Honda added Variable Cylinder Management to the two-wheel-drive models. This VCM tech proved to be problematic in some cases, which led to a class action lawsuit for Honda Motor Co.

2007 changes
For the 2007 model year, Honda added Nimbus Gray Metallic, Dark Cherry Pearl, Aberdeen Green Metallic, and Formal Black as four new colors to all models.

2008 changes
For the last model year of the generation Honda added two new trims. The VP (Value Package) replaces the LX as base trim and SE (special edition) goes in between the EX and EX-L trim.

Second generation (YF3/4; 2008) 

The larger second generation Pilot was unveiled as a prototype in January 2008 at the North American International Auto Show. Assembled at Honda Manufacturing of Alabama in Lincoln, Alabama, it was offered in five trims; LX, EX, EX-L, Touring and SE (2015 only). EPA fuel economy is rated at  city / highway with front-wheel-drive and 16 mpg city / 22 mpg highway for all-wheel-drive.

Both drivetrains were equipped with five-speed automatics. The redesigned headlights lost the previous generation's halogen projectors and return to standard halogen reflectors. Features included new two-position memory settings for the driver's seat, a new power tailgate, and the gear shift was relocated from the steering column to the center console between the front seats. The Touring trim included special "Touring" badging on the right side of the back door, a 120-volt power outlet, and a satellite-linked Honda navigation system.

2011 changes
The 2011 model year had minimal changes. The voice-activated navigation system which was previously exclusive to the Touring trim became available on the EX-L trim and rear entertainment system became standard equipment on the Touring trim.

2012 facelift

The 2012 model year introduced a redesigned front fascia, new alloy wheels, and updates to the interior along with changes to the bumper.

2013 changes
The 2013 model year included a standard rearview backup camera, i-MID central dashboard 8-inch LCD screen, USB connector, Bluetooth hands-free calling and wireless audio streaming, and tri-zone climate control.

2015 changes
The SE (special edition) trim was added which came standard with a power moonroof, satellite radio, and rear seat entertainment system.

Safety
The Pilot uses Honda's Advanced Compatibility Engineering front bracket. For the 2013 model year a rear-view backup camera was made standard. The Insurance Institute for Highway Safety (IIHS) found the Honda Pilot's driver death rate of 2 deaths per million registered among the ten lowest released in their report

*vehicle structure also rated "Poor"

†Because of more stringent tests, 2011 and newer model ratings are not comparable to pre–2011 ratings.

Third generation (YF5/6; 2015) 

The third-generation 2016 Pilot debuted at the Chicago Auto Show in February 2015, and production began in May. It was made available for sale in June.

The exterior is sleeker in appearance compared to its boxier predecessor with a 10 percent reduction in drag area. Added to the exterior are standard LED brake and tail lights, LED daytime running lights (DRLs) on EX trims and above, and LED headlamps with automatic high-low beam switching the on new Elite model with special "Elite" badging. The Elite trim level also gained features that were new to the Pilot, including ventilated front seats, heated rear captain's chairs which reduced the seating capacity to seven from eight, and a panoramic roof. Alloy wheels became standard.

Newly available safety features include Honda's LaneWatch passenger-side mirror camera or Blind Spot Information (BSI) and rear Cross Traffic Monitor. Additional options, including Forward Collision Warning (FCW) with Collision Mitigation Braking System (CMBS), Lane Departure Warning (LDW) with Lane Keeping Assist System (LKAS) and Road Departure Mitigation (RDM), and Adaptive Cruise Control (ACC) are available as part of the Honda Sensing suite. A tri-angle backup camera is standard with dynamic guidelines optional.

With all-wheel drive models the amount of engine torque sent to each rear wheel is variable. EPA-estimated fuel economy is improved with front-wheel drive (FWD) 6-speed models registering //, and all-wheel drive (AWD) models registering // (city/highway/combined). 9-speed models see fuel economy of // mpg in FWD configuration and // (city/highway/combined) in AWD configuration.

Structurally 21.3% of the Pilot's body is composed of 980, 1300 and 1,500 MPa ultra-high-strength steels, 5% is from aluminum or magnesium, an additional 34.5% is 270 MPa mild strength steel used in areas to minimize repair costs.

2017 changes 
For the 2017 model year, Apple CarPlay and Android Auto were added to all trims except for the base LX trim.

2019 facelift

For the 2019 model year, Honda has refreshed the Pilot inside and out. The powertrain for the Pilot has remained unchanged, but Honda did revise the nine-speed transmission and start-stop system that are only found on the Touring and Elite trims. The exterior now featured new bumpers, grille, wheels, standard LED headlights, and revised tail lights. A hands-free tailgate is now available. In the interior, the gauge cluster is replaced with a new one, similar to the one found on the Odyssey. The infotainment system is updated with the latest HondaLink software and it also features the CabinControl app (also found in the Odyssey). 4G LTE hotspot, CabinTalk, and a new rear entertainment system are now available. The volume slider has also been replaced with a volume knob. Honda has replaced the steering wheel with a new design, also from the Odyssey. Honda Sensing is now standard on all trim levels for the Pilot.

2020 changes
For the 2020 model year, a new Black Edition trim was added to the lineup.

2021 changes
The 9-speed transmission is now standard on all trim levels, and a Special Edition is slotted between EX-L and Touring trims.

2022 changes 

For the 2022 model year, Honda introduced an entry-level Sport trim and a new TrailSport off-road oriented trim. The Sport trim replaced the discontinued LX and EX trim levels. On the interior, TrailSport models include TrailSport logos on seats and orange stitching. 

Other changes to the 2022 Pilot include the 8-inch infotainment system and LED headlights becoming standard equipment and the introduction of a new Sonic Gray Pearl exterior paint color. Honda Pilot 2023: Honda's Most Capable SUV

Safety

1 vehicle structure also rated "Good".
2 strength-to-weight ratio: 5.22

Fourth generation (YG1/2; 2022) 

The fourth-generation Pilot was revealed on November 7, 2022. It is connected to a ten-speed automatic gearbox. There are five distinct trim levels available: Sport, TrailSport, EX-L, Touring, and Elite.

Sales

References

External links

Pilot Official US site

Pilot
Cars introduced in 2002
2010s cars
2020s cars
Mid-size sport utility vehicles
Crossover sport utility vehicles
All-wheel-drive vehicles
Front-wheel-drive vehicles
Motor vehicles manufactured in the United States